German submarine U-31 was a Type VIIA U-boat of Nazi Germany's Kriegsmarine during World War II. She was laid down on 1 March 1936 as yard number 912, launched on 25 September and commissioned on 28 December 1936.

Design
As one of the first ten German Type VII submarines later designated as Type VIIA submarines, U-31 had a displacement of  when at the surface and  while submerged. She had two shafts and two  propellers.

U-31 was fitted with five  torpedo tubes (four fitted at the bow and one at the stern), eleven torpedoes, one  SK C/35 naval gun, 220 rounds, and an anti-aircraft gun. The boat had a complement of between forty-four and sixty.

Service history
During her career U-31 was involved in seven war patrols.

First patrol
U-31 was one of the few ocean-going submarines deployed to the Baltic Sea instead of the Atlantic Ocean on the eve of World War II.  Departing Memel under the command of Johannes Habekost on 27 August, this uneventful trip was concluded quickly with the rapid destruction of the Polish Navy and the boat put in at Wilhelmshaven on 2 September.

Second patrol
After her quick return to Germany, U-31 became one of three Type VII reserve boats, going to sea again when Karl Dönitz ordered a redeployment of the U-boat force on 8 September. Habekost had found the convoy the day before and per orders reported the convoy's location, course and speed to Dönitz. Excited by this first reliable convoy report, he ordered all available boats to converge and attack the convoy. U-31 maneuvered into attack position and in the nighttime hours made an attack. Thinking he had sunk two ships, Habekost had however suffered torpedo failure, and thus only the 4,060 GRT Aviemore was actually sunk out of the convoy by U-31. U-31 would later sink the slightly larger Hazelside, of 4,646 GRT, on 24 September before concluding the patrol and returning to Wilhelmshaven on 2 October 1939.

First sinking
On 11 March 1940 U-31 was sunk in the Schillig Roads near buoy 12 by four bombs from a Bristol Blenheim, O of No. 82 Squadron RAF, with the loss of 58 lives. The U-boat had been on trials and carried eleven workers from the shipyard and two assistants to the flotilla engineer in addition to her regular complement.

The U-boat was raised later that month, repaired and returned to service on 30 July 1940 with Kptlt. Prellberg in command.

Second sinking
U-31 was sunk again on 2 November 1940, north-west of Ireland, by depth charges from the British destroyer , which picked up 44 survivors (or 43, sources vary), from the crew of 46.

A mine laid by U-31 damaged the British battleship  of 33,950 tons.

Summary of raiding history

References

Notes

Citations

Bibliography

External links

 

1936 ships
German Type VIIA submarines
Military units and formations of Nazi Germany in the Spanish Civil War
Ships built in Bremen (state)
U-boats commissioned in 1936
U-boats sunk in 1940
U-boats sunk by British aircraft
U-boats sunk by depth charges
U-boats sunk by British warships
World War II shipwrecks in the Atlantic Ocean
World War II submarines of Germany
Maritime incidents in March 1940
Maritime incidents in November 1940